Kvæfjord cake, or  ("the world's best"), is a sponge cake baked with meringue, vanilla cream and almonds. 

The cake is named for Kvæfjord, a municipality in Norway.
In September 2002, the cake was named Norway's national cake by listeners of Nitimen, a Norwegian entertainment show. Other participants included marzipan cake, carrot cake, kransekake and chocolate cake.

See also

References

External links
  Besøkt 7. juni 2009.

Norwegian desserts
Almond desserts
Sponge cakes